Drummond Cricket Club Ground is a cricket ground in Limavady, County Londonderry, Northern Ireland. In 2005, the ground hosted a List A match in the 2005 ICC Trophy between Oman and Papua New Guinea, which resulted in a Papua New Guinean victory by 93 runs.

In club cricket, the ground is home to Drummond Cricket Club.

References

External links
Drummond Cricket Club Ground at CricketArchive

Cricket grounds in Northern Ireland
Sports venues in County Londonderry
Cricket clubs in County Londonderry
Cricket clubs in Northern Ireland
Limavady